Gian Bazzi (3 April 1931 – 7 January 2016) was a Swiss professional ice hockey player who competed for the Swiss national team at the 1952 Winter Olympics.

References

External links

1931 births
2016 deaths
Ice hockey players at the 1952 Winter Olympics
Lausanne HC players
Olympic ice hockey players of Switzerland
People from Davos
Swiss ice hockey left wingers
Sportspeople from Graubünden